The 1953–54 Israel State Cup (Gvia HaMedina) was the 17th season of Israel's nationwide football cup competition and the second after the Israeli Declaration of Independence.

The competition started in March 1953, after yet another agreement ending a rift between the Hapoel and Maccabi factions in the IFA, and the first rounds were played as a part of the 1952–53 Israeli football season. The competition continued during the 1953–54 season.

The final was held at the Basa Stadium in Tel Aviv on 3 July 1954. Maccabi Tel Aviv defeated Maccabi Netanya 4–0 and won its seventh cup.

Results

First round
10 of the 11 Liga Gimel (3rd tier) clubs which had registered to play in the cup competed in the first round. Matches were due to be held on 21 March 1953. However, only one match, between Beitar Haifa and Hapoel Acre was held, and the rest were played in early April 1953.

Bye: Kadima Jaffa

Second round
26 teams from Liga Bet joined the six qualifiers from the first round. Matches were played on 18 April 1953.

Third round
The 12 teams of Liga Alef entered the competition. Matches were held on 2 May 1953. Maccabi Tel Aviv and Maccabi Jerusalem required a replay, which was delayed and was finally played on 12 September 1953.

Replay

Fourth round
The final 14 teams met in this round, which matches were played on 14 November 1953, except for the match between Hapoel Tel Aviv and Maccabi Petah Tikva, which was postponed to 9 January 1954. Both teams requested the postponement as they had major players injured after the Israel's 1954 FIFA World Cup qualification matches at Greece and Yugoslavia.

The match between Hapoel Jerusalem and Hapoel Petah Tikva was abandoned at the 60th minute due to weather conditions and was replayed on 12 December 1953.

Maccabi Tel Aviv were on the brink of elimination, as they were losing 1–2 at Hapoel Kiryat Haim, before scoring a 90th-minute equalizer, and winning the match in extra time.

Replay

Quarter-finals
In early March 1954, Israel played the 1954 FIFA World Cup qualification return home matches against Yugoslavia and Greece, and then went on a two-month tour of South Africa. After the return of the national team, the quarter-final matches were played on 29 May 1954.

Bye: Hapoel Petah Tikva

Semi-finals
Both matches were played on 5 June 1954.

Final

Notes

References
100 Years of Football 1906-2006, Elisha Shohat (Israel), 2006

External links
 Israel Football Association website

Israel State Cup
State Cup
State Cup
Israel State Cup seasons